Xavier Samuel (born 10 December 1983) is an Australian film and theatre actor. He has appeared in leading roles in the feature films Adore, September, Further We Search, Newcastle, The Loved Ones, Frankenstein, A Few Best Men, and played Riley Biers in The Twilight Saga: Eclipse, and Billy in Spin Out. He also starred as Cass Chaplin in Blonde.

Early life and education
Samuel was born in Hamilton, Victoria, the son of Maree and Clifford Samuel. He grew up in Adelaide, South Australia, and graduated from Rostrevor College in 2001 where he boarded. When Samuel was 13, his family spent a year in Darwin due to his parents' teaching jobs.

He has a younger brother, Benedict, a writer, producer and actor, as well as an older sister, Bridget, a stage manager.

Despite completing his senior secondary years at Rostrevor College, Samuel undertook final year drama at Christian Brothers College, where he played the part of Tom Snout (the wall) in Rostrevor College's production of Shakespeare's A Midsummer Night's Dream as well as playing Belvile in CBC's production of Aphra Behn's The Rover (The Banished Cavaliers).

Samuel later attended Flinders University Drama Centre and graduated in 2006.

Career
Samuel made his debut on the Australian TV show McLeod's Daughters in 2003. He starred in the Australian horror movie Road Train as Marcus, and also acted in the Australian movie Drowning with Elephant Princess star Miles Szanto, directed by Craig Boreham.

Alongside Mia Wasikowska, Samuel was in 2007 the Australian film September, set in 1968 where two young boys who share a passion for boxing are friends.

In 2008, Samuel starred in the Australian surfing movie Newcastle, opposite Reshad Strik.

In 2009, Samuel was cast as Brent in the Australian horror/thriller movie The Loved Ones in the lead role opposite Robin McLeavy.

In early 2010, Samuel was cast as Riley Biers in The Twilight Saga: Eclipse. The film was Samuel's first high-profile film. Samuel was nominated for, and won, his first film award at the 2011 MTV Movie Awards. In an interview with GQ Australia  in November 2010, Samuel described the process of his shock Twilight casting. "I sent off the audition tape from Sydney, which landed in a big pile on someone's desk. So then to actually hear something back was kind of unusual. I guess I was a bit of a gamble, but it's bizarre and wonderful."

Samuel appeared in the 2011 film Anonymous.

In 2012 Samuel played a lead role in A Few Best Men with other notable stars, Rebel Wilson and Olivia Newton-John. The film is about a wedding.

Eventually forming a relationship with co-star Phoebe Tonkin, Samuel was cast in 3D feature Bait, released in September 2012.

In 2013 he played Ian in Adore beside Robin Wright and Naomi Watts, which is based on Doris Lessing's book and directed by Anne Fontaine. The film is about two middle-aged mothers who become the lovers of each other's sons. Anne Fontaine coaxed Samuel through rehearsals of the love scenes in a hotel room using a paid actress who stood in for Wright. The film was shot in Seal Rocks in New South Wales and premiered at the Sundance Film Festival under its original name of Two Mothers.

Alongside Hugo Weaving and an owl, Samuel was cast in the movie Healing in 2014. The film is about a prison program where the inmates rehabilitate birds. When speaking about Doris the owl, Samuel stated that he grew rather fond of her as she was easy to play with and was a real diva.

In 2014, Samuel was cast alongside Brad Pitt and Shia LaBeouf in the $80 million blockbuster Fury, about a group of Americans in Nazi Germany at the end of World War II.

In 2016, Samuel played the titular character in The Death and Life of Otto Bloom, with Rachel Ward and her daughter, Matilda Brown. 

In the same year, Samuel performed alongside Kate Beckinsale, Chloe Sevigny, Stephen Fry, and James Fleet in the critically-acclaimed film Love and Friendship, adapted from Jane Austen novel Lady Susan.

Starring alongside Hugo Weaving yet again, Samuel played the role of Simon Heywood in the Australian TV series, Seven Types of Ambiguity in 2017. The series was based on Seven Types of Ambiguity, a 2003 novel by Australian writer Elliot Perlman.

Samuel played Kit Parker in the Amazon thriller series Tell Me Your Secrets in 2021.

In 2022, he starred in the Marilyn Monroe bio-pic Blonde, written and directed by Andrew Dominik and adapted from the 2000 novel of the same name by Joyce Carol Oates. It stars Ana de Armas as Marilyn Monroe and premiered on Netflix in September 2022.

Personal life
As a child, Samuel wanted to be an Australian rules football star like his hero Tony Modra, and is a supporter of the Adelaide Football Club.

Samuel regularly moves between America and Australia to take on roles.

From 2010 to 2011 Samuel dated German model Shermine Shahrivar. In 2012, Samuel dated his Bait 3D co-star, Phoebe Tonkin. From 2012 to 2015, Samuel dated his Plush co-star Emily Browning. Model Jessica Gomes was in a relationship for two years with Samuel that started in 2016. In 2018, Samuel and actress Marianna Palka started dating.

Acting work

Theatre

Filmography

Awards and nominations

References

External links
 

1983 births
Living people
21st-century American male actors
Australian expatriate male actors in the United States
Australian male film actors
Australian male television actors
Male actors from Victoria (Australia)
People educated at Rostrevor College
People from Hamilton, Victoria